Jason Bennett may refer to:

 Jason Bennett (cricketer) (born 1982), West Indian first-class cricketer
 Jason Bennett (basketball) (born 1986), American basketball player